The 2022 FIBA U20 Women's European Championship Division B was the 16th edition of the Division B of the Women's European basketball championship for national under-20 teams. It was played from 9 to 17 July 2022 in Skopje, North Macedonia. Montenegro women's national under-20 basketball team won the tournament.

Participating teams

  (16th place, 2019 FIBA U20 Women's European Championship Division A)

First round
The draw of the first round was held on 15 February 2022 in Freising, Germany.

In the first round, the teams were drawn into four groups of four or five. The first two teams from each group advance to the playoffs; the other teams will play in the 9th–18th place classification round.

Group A

Group B

Group C

Group D

Classification round

Group E

Group F

17th place match

15th place match

13th place match

11th place match

9th place match

Championship playoffs

Quarterfinals

5th–8th place playoffs

Semifinals

7th place match

5th place match

3rd place match

Final

Final standings

References

External links
Official website

2022
2022–23 in European women's basketball
International youth basketball competitions hosted by North Macedonia
FIBA U20
July 2022 sports events in Europe
Sports competitions in Skopje